Will Oyowe (born 28 October 1987) is a Belgian sprinter.

Achievements

National titles
Oyowe won a national championship at individual senior level.
Belgian Indoor Athletics Championships
200 m: 2014

References

External links
 

1987 births
Living people
Belgian male sprinters